Ixworth Thorpe is a small village and civil parish in the West Suffolk district of the English county of Suffolk. In 2005 its estimated population was 60. The parish council is operated jointly with Ixworth. From the 2011 Census the population of the village was not recorded separately.

History
The village was mentioned in the Domesday Book at which time it was known as Torp or Torpa. It was a large village with around 31 households at this time as well as two mills. The manor formed part of the holdings of the Huard of Vernon, having been held by the Abbey of Bury St Edmunds in 1066.

Church of All Saints
The Church of All Saints was the parish church and is now a chapel of ease. The building has 11th century doorways, a thatched roof and lies to the south of the village alongside the A1088. It is a Grade I listed building and contains "nationally important" carved wooden bench ends dating from the 15th century and a brick built Tudor porch as well as two early medieval coffin lids set into the floor near the south door.

References

External links

Villages in Suffolk
Civil parishes in Suffolk
Borough of St Edmundsbury